King Ini may refer to:

Ine of Wessex, King of Wessex from AD 689–726

Or one of several Egyptian pharaohs:

 Nyuserre Ini, pharaoh of the 5th Dynasty of Egypt, during the 25th century BC, Old Kingdom
 Qakare Ini, pretender to the Egyptian throne during the 11th or 12th Dynasty
 Merhotepre Ini, pharaoh of the 13th Dynasty of Egypt during the Second Intermediate Period, c. 1675 BC
 Mershepsesre Ini II, pharaoh of the late 13th Dynasty of Egypt during the Second Intermediate Period, c. 1650 BC
 Menkheperre Ini, a king of the 23rd Dynasty of Egypt ruling over Thebes, during the Third Intermediate Period in the 8th century BC